Gilberto Parlotti (17 September 1940 – 9 June 1972) was an Italian professional motorcycle racer competing in the FIM World Championship between 1969 and 1972. He competed for the Benelli, Derbi, Morbidelli and Tomos factories.

Parlotti was born in Zero Branco, Treviso, Italy. After winning the first two 125cc races of the 1972 Grand Prix motorcycle racing season in West Germany and France, Parlotti decided to race at the 1972 Isle of Man TT Races to take advantage of his main championship rival Angel Nieto's absence from the Isle of Man Mountain Course.  While lying in first place on the second lap during the 1972 125cc Ultra-Lightweight TT race held in heavy rain, Gilberto Parlotti crashed his 125cc Morbidelli motorcycle at the Verandah section on the A18 Mountain Road and died from his injuries.

The death of Gilberto Parlotti helped bring about the end of the Isle of Man TT Races as a world championship event. After his death, his close friend Giacomo Agostini announced he would never again race at the Isle of Man TT Races because he considered it too unsafe to be a part of the FIM World Motorcycle Championship calendar. At the time, the Isle of Man TT was the most prestigious race on the world championship calendar. Other top riders joined his boycott of the event and by 1976, the event was dropped from the Grand Prix championship schedule.  From 1973 any weather conditions that would not allow a rescue helicopter to take-off would lead to the race start being delayed or cancelled at any Isle of Man TT Race.

Motorcycle Grand Prix results 
Points system from 1969 to 1987:

(key) (Races in bold indicate pole position; races in italics indicate fastest lap)

Sources

External links
 TT database rider profile iomtt.com
 TT database TT results iomtt.com
 Gilberto Parlotti career profile at Motorsport Memorial

1940 births
1972 deaths
Sportspeople from the Province of Treviso
Italian motorcycle racers
125cc World Championship riders
50cc World Championship riders
Isle of Man TT riders
Motorcycle racers who died while racing
Sport deaths in the Isle of Man